Monument is the sixth studio album by Trance duo Blank & Jones. It was released in 2004.

Track listing
"Monument" – 0:47
"What You Need" – 3:34
"City Of Angels" – 4:49
"Mind Of The Wonderful (feat. Elles De Graaf)" – 9:18
"Zero Gravity" – 5:35
"A Forest (feat. Robert Smith)" – 6:51
"Stars Shine Bright" – 4:42
"Perfect Silence (feat. Bobo)" – 6:15
"Flowtation" – 7:32
"Waiting for the Light" – 6:23
"Urban Hymn" – 5:46
"That's Right" – 2:29

Monument (US Edition) Water Music Dance # 302 060 429 2, single CD.

Track listing
"Monument" – 0:47
"What You Need" – 3:34
"City Of Angels" – 4:49
"Mind Of The Wonderful (Album) (feat. Elles De Graaf)" – 9:18
"Zero Gravity" – 5:35
"Stars Shine Bright" – 4:42
"Perfect Silence (feat. Bobo)" – 6:15
"Flowtation" – 7:32
"Waiting For The Light" – 6:23
"Urban Hymn" – 5:46
"That's Right" – 2:29
"A Forest (feat. Robert Smith) (Ron van den Beuken Remix Edit)" – 4:35
"A Forest (feat. Robert Smith) (Ron van den Beuken Remix)" – 7:46
"A Forest (feat. Robert Smith) (Exor Remix)" – 8:43
"A Forest (feat. Robert Smith)" – 6:51 is NOT included on this printing.

Monument (2008 Remastered Deluxe Edition) SoundColours # SC0010, double CD, Digipak.

Track listing
CD1
"Monument" – 0:46
"What You Need" – 3:34
"City Of Angels" – 4:48
"Mind Of The Wonderful (feat. Elles De Graaf)" – 9:17
"Zero Gravity" – 5:35
"A Forest (feat. Robert Smith)" - 6:51
"Stars Shine Bright" – 4:42
"Perfect Silence (feat. Bobo)" – 6:14
"Flowtation" – 7:31
"Waiting For The Light" – 6:22
"Urban Hymn" – 5:46
"That's Right" – 2:24
"The Hardest Heart (feat. Anne Clark) (Suburban Mix)" - 5:37
"Perfect Silence (feat. Bobo) (Future Pop Edit)" – 4:03
"Summer Sun" – 3:32

CD2
"Zero Gravity (US Break Mix)" - 8:04
"The Hardest Heart (feat. Anne Clark) (Joshua Cunningham 2007 Rework)" - 8:59
"Stars Shine Bright (Sam Sharp Remix)" – 9:54
"City Of Angels (Progressive Mix)" – 7:26
"Perfect Silence (feat. Bobo) (E-Craig 212 Remix)" – 10:08
"A Forest (feat. Robert Smith) (Exor Mix)" - 8:46
"Mind Of The Wonderful (feat. Elles De Graaf) (Mark Norman Vocal Mix)" – 6:35
"Flowtation (Senses Remix)" – 7:17
"Summer Sun (Wellenrausch Remix)" – 8:53

Blank & Jones albums
2004 albums